Elizabeth Bailey was an American economist.

Elizabeth Bailey may also refer to:

Elizabeth Bailey, character playedby Susie Blake

See also
Elisabeth Tova Bailey, author
Elizabeth Bailey Gomez
Betty Bailey (disambiguation)
Beth Bailey, fictional character
Beth Bailey (historian)